Angel Song is a studio album by the Canadian musician Kenny Wheeler, recorded in 1996 and released in 1997 on the ECM label as ECM 1607. It features performances by Lee Konitz, Bill Frisell and Dave Holland.

Track listing
All compositions by Kenny Wheeler.

"Nicolette" – 8:36
"Present Past" – 12:08
"Kind Folk" – 8:38
"Unti" – 9:55
"Angel Song" – 7:36
"Onmo" – 5:51
"Nonetheless" – 5:29
"Past Present" – 7:05
"Kind of Gentle" – 4:42

Personnel
Kenny Wheeler – flugelhorn, trumpet
Bill Frisell – guitar
Lee Konitz – alto saxophone
Dave Holland – bass

References

Kenny Wheeler albums
Bill Frisell albums
Lee Konitz albums
1997 albums